Group B of the 2001 Fed Cup Asia/Oceania Zone Group II was one of two pools in the Asia/Oceania Zone Group II of the 2001 Fed Cup. Three teams competed in a round robin competition, with the top two teams qualifying for the play-offs.

Philippines vs. Malaysia

Sri Lanka vs. Syria

Philippines vs. Sri Lanka

Malaysia vs. Syria

Philippines vs. Syria

Malaysia vs. Sri Lanka

See also
Fed Cup structure

References

External links
 Fed Cup website

2001 Fed Cup Asia/Oceania Zone